Acrocercops quinquistrigella is a moth of the family Gracillariidae. It is known from the United States (Kentucky, Texas, Florida and Georgia).

The larvae feed on Sida rhombifolia. They probably mine the leaves of their host plant.

References

quinquistrigella
Moths of North America
Moths described in 1875